Aleksandr Zhukovskiy is also the name of a cinematographer who worked with director Yuri Norstein, most recently on The Overcoat.

Aliaksandr ("Sasha") Zhukouski (ZOO - COW - SKI) (born October 6, 1979) is a Belarusian sprint canoer who has competed since 2001. He won four medals at the ICF Canoe Sprint World Championships with a silver (C-4 1000 m: 2001) and three bronzes (C-4 200 m: 2005, C-4 1000 m: 2002, 2006).

Zhukouski also competed in two Summer Olympics, earning his best finish of fourth in the C-1 500 m event at Athens in 2004.

References

1979 births
Belarusian male canoeists
Canoeists at the 2004 Summer Olympics
Canoeists at the 2008 Summer Olympics
Canoeists at the 2012 Summer Olympics
Living people
Olympic canoeists of Belarus
ICF Canoe Sprint World Championships medalists in Canadian